Richard John "Dick" Bruggeman (born June 13, 1947) is an American hurdler. He competed in the men's 400 metres hurdles at the 1972 Summer Olympics.

References

1947 births
Living people
Athletes (track and field) at the 1972 Summer Olympics
American male hurdlers
Olympic track and field athletes of the United States
Place of birth missing (living people)